Rehan Afridi (born 10 May 1992) is a Pakistani cricketer who plays for Khyber Pakhtunkhwa. In September 2019, he was named in Khyber Pakhtunkhwa's squad for the 2019–20 Quaid-e-Azam Trophy tournament. In January 2021, following the final of the 2020–21 Quaid-e-Azam Trophy, he was named as the Best Wicket-keeper of the tournament. Later the same month, he was named in Khyber Pakhtunkhwa's squad for the 2020–21 Pakistan Cup.

References

External links
 

1992 births
Living people
Pakistani cricketers
Federally Administered Tribal Areas cricketers
Khyber Pakhtunkhwa cricketers
Pashtun people
Afridi people